is a passenger railway station in the city of Yūki, Ibaraki Prefecture, Japan, operated by East Japan Railway Company (JR East).

Lines
Otabayashi Station is served by the Mito Line, and is located 4.9 km from the official starting point of the line at Oyama Station.

Station layout
The station consists of a single side platform serving traffic in both directions. There is no station building, but only a shelter on the platform. The station is unattended.

History
Otabayashi Station was opened on 1 April 1955.  The station was absorbed into the JR East network upon the privatization of the Japanese National Railways (JNR) on 1 April 1987.

Surrounding area
 Yūki Police Station

See also
 List of railway stations in Japan

External links

  JR East Station Information 

Railway stations in Ibaraki Prefecture
Mito Line
Railway stations in Japan opened in 1955
Yūki, Ibaraki